Guy Vernor Henry (March 9, 1839 – October 27, 1899) was an American military officer and Medal of Honor recipient who served as military governor of Puerto Rico.

Biography
Henry was born in Fort Smith, Indian Territory (now Arkansas), the son of William Seton Henry and Arietta Livingston Thompson Henry. His mother was the granddaughter of Vice President Daniel D. Tompkins and Secretary of the Navy and Supreme Court Justice Smith Thompson. He was a fifth great-grandson of  Robert Livingston.
William Seton Henry (1816–1851) was an 1835 graduate of the United States Military Academy, and attained the rank of Brevet Major for his service in the Mexican–American War. Guy V. Henry graduated from the United States Military Academy in May 1861, serving as a Union officer in the Civil War, and later in conflicts against the Native Americans in the West and southwest of the United States of America. From May 25, 1891, to October 3, 1894, while commanding the 7th Cavalry Regiment, he was also commander of Fort Myer, Virginia. During the Spanish–American War, he was dispatched to Guantánamo, Cuba, and later sent to Puerto Rico, alongside General Nelson Miles.

Henry was with General George Crook at the Battle of the Rosebud on June 17, 1876 when Crook was attacked by forces led by Crazy Horse. Henry was very badly wounded in the face. When John Finerty (correspondent for the Chicago Tribune, reporting from the field) commented on Guy's grievous wound, the latter merely told him, "For this we are soldiers," and encouraged Finerty to join the army.

He received successive brevets for gallantry in various battles and was brevetted brigadier general, United States Army, for gallantry at the Battle of Rosebud in Montana Territory, where he was shot through the face while fighting Native Americans. He received the Medal of Honor on December 5, 1893, for his Civil War service at the Battle of Cold Harbor on June 1, 1864, where he was serving as a colonel and commanded a brigade.

During the invasion of Puerto Rico, Henry led a "Provisional Division" from the city of Ponce to Arecibo, Puerto Rico, to rendezvous with General Theodore Schwan, who was arriving from the city of Mayagüez. The tropical rain impeded his trek and before he reached Mayagüez, the conflict was over.

On December 6, 1898, he was designated Governor of Puerto Rico. On February 6, 1899, he dissolved the Cabinet of Puerto Rico, which was instituted with the Autonomic Charter. Henry also eliminated taxes on basic food items. On May 2, 1899 he instituted the eight-hour work day in Puerto Rico. On May 9, 1899, he was replaced by General George W. Davis.

Henry died of pneumonia in New York City in October 1899 and was buried at Arlington National Cemetery.

General Henry was an Hereditary Member of the Aztec Club of 1847, a First Class Companion of the Military Order of the Loyal Legion of the United States and the Regular Army and Navy Union.

Personal life
Henry's first marriage was to Frances Wharton (1843-1873) of Philadelphia. They had at least two children:
 Sarah Wharton Henry (1867–1948), who married Lt. James Watson Benton, an 1885 graduate of West Point and grandson of James Watson Webb.
 Thomas Lloyd Henry (1872–1911)
Henry married secondly Julia McNair (1844–1917) and had at least two sons:
 Guy V. Henry, Jr. (1875–1967) also served in the military with a distinguished career, and went on to win a bronze medal in the 1912 Olympic Games in Stockholm.
 William Seton Henry II (1879–1946).

Awards
 Medal of Honor
 Civil War Campaign Medal
 Indian Campaign Medal
 Spanish Campaign Medal
 Army of Puerto Rican Occupation Medal

Note – Except for the Medal of Honor, the above listed awards were not established until after General Henry's death.

Medal of Honor citation
Rank and organization: Colonel, 40th Massachusetts Infantry. Place and date: At Cold Harbor, Va., June 1, 1864. Entered service at: Reading Pa. Birth: Fort Smith, Indian Ter. Date of issue: December 5, 1893.

Citation:

Led the assaults of his brigade upon the enemy's works, where he had 2 horses shot under him.

See also

 List of Medal of Honor recipients
 List of American Civil War Medal of Honor recipients: G–L
 List of governors of Puerto Rico
 History of Puerto Rico

Notes

External links
 
 
 
 

1839 births
1899 deaths
Union Army officers
United States Army Medal of Honor recipients
Burials at Arlington National Cemetery
Governors of Puerto Rico
American military personnel of the Spanish–American War
United States Army generals
United States Military Academy alumni
People of the Great Sioux War of 1876
People of Massachusetts in the American Civil War
People from Fort Smith, Arkansas
Buffalo Soldiers
American Civil War recipients of the Medal of Honor
Pine Ridge Campaign